Cruis'n Velocity is a racing game and the fourth game in the Cruis'n series. The game was developed by Graphic State and released by Midway for the Game Boy Advance in 2001. It is the only game in the series not to be preceded by an arcade release and features slightly different gameplay from its predecessors. The game uses the same engine as Dark Arena, a first-person shooter game also developed by Graphic State, to achieve a pseudo-3D effect. This approach garnered the game mixed reviews.

Gameplay 
Unlike the previous games in the series, instead of the racing down one-way courses consisting of streets based on real-life locations while avoiding various road hazards such as oncoming traffic and construction, the players travel through a large environment racing eleven different cars and winning the races without getting hit by walls and such. Fourteen different locations, the same as Cruis'n Exotica, are available.

There's a new speed boost system by pressing on the gas button twice. There's also an option that the player can have a damage system on or off and there will be a damage bar and it can go down when the players crash into different objects.

There are three different races to choose from. Players can run through the Cruis'n Cup which unlocks new courses and cars. Championship allows players go through courses and if to earn points like in Mario Kart. In Freestyle players can go through courses to get the highest track record.

The game features a three-player multiplayer mode using the Game Boy Advance's link cable. Instead of a save feature this game used a password system so that players can save their progress.

Reception 

Cruis'n Velocity received "mixed" reviews according to video game review aggregator Metacritic.

IGN called the game "somewhat enjoyable" with its multitude of play modes, while criticizing the collision detection, game-crashing bugs, use of a password system and A.I. They also remarked that the game was significantly less over-the-top than its arcade predecessors. The game's Doom-style graphics engine was criticized by AllGame, which called the graphics "ugly and sluggish" and compared them unfavorably to Mario Kart: Super Circuit, which used scaling to achieve its pseudo-3D effect. Nintendo Power called it a "so-so racing game".

References

External links 
 

2001 video games
Cruis'n
Game Boy Advance games
Game Boy Advance-only games
Graphic State games
Midway video games
Multiplayer and single-player video games
Video games developed in the United Kingdom